Khanewal is a city in Punjab, Pakistan.

Khanewal may also refer to:

Khanewal District, district of South Punjab.
Khanewal Tehsil, tehsil of Khanewal district

Railway stations
Khanewal Junction railway station
Khanewal-Wazirabad Branch Line

See also
Khanowal, village in India